The 110th Division was created in February 1950 under the Regulation of the Redesignations of All Organizations and Units of the Army, issued by Central Military Commission on November 1, 1948, basing on the 326th Division of Republic of China Army defected on September 19, 1949 during the Chinese Civil War.

The division was part of 37th Corps.

In April 1951 the division absorbed 4th Cavalry Division as preparation before entering Korea.

In September the division moved into Korea as a part of the People's Volunteer Army. During its deployment to Korea the division was in charge of rear guards mission and the construction of Namsi Airfield.

In December the division returned from Korea.

In February 1952 the division was inactivated and merged with 107th Division.

References

中国人民解放军各步兵师沿革, http://blog.sina.com.cn/s/blog_a3f74a990101cp1q.html

Infantry divisions of the People's Liberation Army
Military units and formations established in 1950
Military units and formations disestablished in 1952